Hetty Feather is a British children's drama series, based on the novel of the same name by Jacqueline Wilson. Set in the Victorian era, it focuses on the life of the title character who was abandoned as a baby, lives first in a Foundling Hospital in London, and later works as a maid for a rich family in their home. The first series aired from 11 May 2015 to 6 July 2015. The series began airing in the United States on BYUtv in 2018. The show concluded with a three-part special which served as the series' sixth and final season.

Premise
The series revolves around Hetty Feather, who was abandoned as a baby at the Foundling Hospital. She and her foster brother Gideon Smeed were fostered for a while by Peg Cotton, but when they turned 5, they had to return to the Foundling Hospital.

The series is set during 1887 and filmed at Cobham Hall, Cobham, Kent and The Historic Dockyard Chatham with The Maidstone Studios as their production base for Series 2 and 3. During series 3, filming moved to Belmont House in Faversham, Kent to double as Calendar Hall, which features from Series 3 to 6.

Characters

Key
† marks that the character is now deceased.

Main characters

Guest and recurring characters

Timeline

Episodes

Series 1 (2015)

Special (2016)

After the end of the episode, The End Of It All in series 4, a five-minute crossover between The Dumping Ground and Hetty Feather aired on CBBC, titled A Special Dumping Ground Adventure. Its official title (according to CBBC Online) is Floss The Foundling and has instead used this title online and in subsequent TV airings.

Series 2 (2016)

Series 3 (2017)

Series 4 (2018)

Series 5 (2019)

Christmas Special (2019)

Series 6 (2020)

Home releases
The first series of Hetty Feather was released on DVD on 27 July 2015. The first season was given a U (Universal) and a PG rating by the BBFC for mild bad language, mild scenes of threat and peril, and mild adult themes (specifically scenes centred on death and bereavement). The second series of Hetty Feather was released on DVD on 18 July 2016.

References

External links 
 
 

2010s British children's television series
2020s British children's television series
2015 British television series debuts
2020 British television series endings
British children's drama television series
BBC children's television shows
English-language television shows
Television series set in the 1880s
Television shows set in London
Television series about orphans
Television series by BBC Studios